Michael Dawson  (born 15 October 1986 in Tauranga) is a New Zealand slalom canoeist who has competed at the international level since 2004.

He won a bronze medal in the inaugural Extreme K1 event at the 2017 ICF Canoe Slalom World Championships in Pau. At the 2012 Summer Olympics in London he competed in the K1 event finishing in 15th place after being eliminated in the semifinals. Four years later in Rio de Janeiro he made the final and finished in 10th place in the K1 event.

In 2010, and again in 2012, he won first place in the extreme-whitewater Green River Narrows Race in North Carolina, USA.

World Cup individual podiums

1 Oceania Championship counting for World Cup points

References

New Zealand male canoeists
1986 births
Living people
Canoeists at the 2012 Summer Olympics
Olympic canoeists of New Zealand
Canoeists at the 2016 Summer Olympics
Sportspeople from Tauranga
Medalists at the ICF Canoe Slalom World Championships